"Prostherapis" dunni is a species of frog endemic to the Venezuelan Coastal Range. Its taxonomic position is uncertain, apart from its placement in the family Aromobatidae; it might be an Aromobates.

Its natural habitats are seasonal montane forests. It was once relatively common but as of 2006, no extant populations in the wild were known, even in suitable habitat. The precise reasons of the decline are not known, but similar declines have been caused by chytridiomycosis. Also habitat loss have occurred.

References

Aromobatidae
Amphibians of Venezuela
Endemic fauna of Venezuela
Taxa named by Juan A. Rivero
Taxonomy articles created by Polbot
Amphibians described in 1961